Clobber may refer to:

 Clobber, an abstract strategy game
 Clobber (cards), a trick based card game
 Clobbering, a computer term for overwriting (often accidentally)
 Clobber (aircraft), the NATO code name for Yakovlev Yak-42 aircraft

See also
 Clobber Girl, the superhero identity of Lisa Simpson